Lolo Pass, elevation , is a mountain pass in the western United States, in the Bitterroot Range of the northern Rocky Mountains.

The pass is the highest point of the historic Lolo Trail, between the Bitterroot Valley in Montana and the Weippe Prairie in Idaho.  The trail, known as naptnišaqs, or "Nez Perce Trail" in Salish, was used by Nez Perce in the 18th century, and by the Lewis and Clark Expedition, guided by Old Toby of the Shoshone, on their westward snowbound journey in September 1805. After a winter at Fort Clatsop in present-day northwestern Oregon, the Corps of Discovery returned the following June.  The Lolo Trail is a National Historic Landmark, designated for its importance to the Lewis and Clark Expedition, and its role in the 1877 Nez Perce War.

The name of the pass is sometimes said to have been Salish version of the French name Laurence or Laurent, but was probably a regular French nickname. The name Lolo was not used by Lewis and Clark. Its first known mention is in the 1810 journal of David Thompson, who described three fur trappers, probably of French descent, named Michael, Lolo, and Gregoire.

The pass was also used in 1877 during the Nez Perce War as some of the Nez Perce under Chief Joseph tried to escape the U.S. Army. Shortly after crossing the pass, the two sides clashed at the Battle of the Big Hole in Montana.

U.S. Highway 12, belatedly completed in 1962, crosses the pass. At the August dedication ceremony at Lolo Pass attended by thousands, the states' governors, Bob Smylie of Idaho and Tim Babcock of Montana, cut through a ceremonial cedar log with a two-man crosscut saw.

The first limited services in Idaho are in Powell,  to the west of the pass, then another  to Lowell, at the confluence of the Lochsa and Selway Rivers to form the Middle Fork of the Clearwater.

On March 1, 2014, the Idaho Department of Fish and Game announced that 23 wolves had been killed in the Lolo Pass area, in order to boost elk populations.

See also
List of National Historic Landmarks in Idaho
National Register of Historic Places listings in Idaho County, Idaho
National Register of Historic Places listings in Missoula County, Montana

References

External links

National Park Service: Lolo Pass Visitor Center and Rest Area
Idaho Transportation Dept. - webcam - Lolo Pass
Idaho Transportation Dept. - roadside historical marker - Lolo Summit
Lolo Pass Visitor Information Center
Lewis and Clark: Additional Sites
 The Lewis & Clark Expedition: Documenting the Uncharted Northwest Name, a National Park Service Teaching with Historic Places (TwHP) lesson plan
 

Landforms of Idaho County, Idaho
Landforms of Missoula County, Montana
Mountain passes of Idaho
Mountain passes of Montana
National Historic Landmarks in Idaho
National Historic Landmarks in Montana
Roads on the National Register of Historic Places in Idaho
Roads on the National Register of Historic Places in Montana
Borders of Idaho
Borders of Montana
Mountains Ranges and Peaks in Missoula County, Montana
Transportation in Missoula County, Montana
Transportation in Idaho County, Idaho
Clearwater National Forest
National Register of Historic Places in Idaho County, Idaho
National Register of Historic Places in Missoula County, Montana
U.S. Route 12
Trails and roads in the American Old West
Bitterroot Range